Mnium stellare, the starry thyme-moss or stellar calcareous moss, is a moss species in the genus Mnium.

References

External links

Mniaceae
Taxa named by Johann Hedwig
Plants described in 1801